Chantry Mvié Nguéma (born 11 March 1980) is a Gabonese former footballer who played as a defender. He made 13 appearances for the Gabon national team from 1999 to 2005. He was also named in Gabon's squad for the 2000 African Cup of Nations tournament.

References

External links
 

1980 births
Living people
Gabonese footballers
Association football defenders
Gabon international footballers
2000 African Cup of Nations players
Place of birth missing (living people)
21st-century Gabonese people